The Iouaridène Formation is a Mesozoic geologic formation in Morocco. Fossil sauropod and theropod tracks have been reported from the formation. It is part of the 'Red Beds' of Morocco alongside the Guettioua Sandstone and Jbel Sidal Formation. The lithology consists of cyclic alternation of meter scale red mudstones and 10's of cm scale carbonate cemented mudstones to very fine sandstones.

See also 
 List of dinosaur-bearing rock formations
 List of stratigraphic units with sauropodomorph tracks
 Sauropod tracks

References

Bibliography 
 Weishampel, David B.; Dodson, Peter; and Osmólska, Halszka (eds.): The Dinosauria, 2nd, Berkeley: University of California Press. 861 pp. .

Geologic formations of Morocco
Jurassic System of Africa
Kimmeridgian Stage
Tithonian Stage
Upper Cretaceous Series of Africa
Berriasian Stage
Valanginian Stage
Hauterivian Stage
Barremian Stage
Sandstone formations
Mudstone formations
Conglomerate formations
Lacustrine deposits
Ichnofossiliferous formations